Guillermo Pont Serra (born December 1, 1921 in Palma de Mallorca, Spain) was a Spanish professional association football player who played as a defender.

Clubs
He played the most of his career for Spanish football giants Real Madrid C.F. He started 87 matches in La Liga for Real, and 8 matches in other competitions.

Honours
Real Madrid
Copa del Generalísimo: 1947
Copa Eva Duarte: 1947

References
 

Real Madrid CF players
Association football defenders
Spanish footballers
1921 births
CD Málaga footballers
2000 deaths
Footballers from Palma de Mallorca